Marco Scaramellini (born 15 October 1965 in Chiavenna) is an Italian politician.

He is a member of Lega Nord and he has served as Mayor of Sondrio since 26 June 2018.

See also
2018 Italian local elections
List of mayors of Sondrio

References

External links
 

1965 births
Living people
Mayors of places in Lombardy
People from Sondrio
Lega Nord politicians
People from Chiavenna